Alain Duret (29 October 1935 – 13 April 2020) was a French writer.

After studying to become a geographer, Duret spent the majority of his career teaching at a large lycée in Paris. He held a doctoral degree in geostrategy from Paris-Sorbonne University, and worked for the newspaper Le Monde for almost thirty years.

His works range from geopolitical essays to detective and science fiction novels. He has published around 20 science fiction short stories, and over 100 articles in various newspapers. His works revolved largely around Marxist ideals.

Alain Duret died on 13 April 2020 in Quincy at the age of 84.

Notable Works
A Lireuse (1978)
Pays et Gens de France (1984)
L'Histoire au jour le jour (1986)
Les Années froides (1986)
Le ciel est par-dessus le toit (1989)
Moyen-Orient, crises et enjeux (1994)
La Nouvelle Menace nucléaire (1996)
Kronikes de la Fédérasion (1997)
Israël-Palestine, un destin partagé (1997)
Le Meilleur Tireur de l'Est (1999)
La Conquête spatiale, du rêve au marché (2002)
Aspects géostratégiques du monde postbipolaire (2010)
Les Occidentaux (2011)
Mars est encore loin (2012)
La Banane (2016)

References

1935 births
2020 deaths
21st-century French novelists
French detective fiction writers
Le Monde writers
Paris-Sorbonne University alumni
French science fiction writers
21st-century French male writers
20th-century French male writers
20th-century French novelists
French male novelists
French male short story writers
Writers from Paris
21st-century French short story writers
French schoolteachers
20th-century French short story writers
21st-century French essayists
20th-century French essayists
French male essayists